Lee Eun-ju (December 22, 1980 – February 22, 2005) was a South Korean actress. She was the star of hit films including Taegukgi and The Scarlet Letter. She died by suicide at age 24.

Life and career
Born in Gunsan, Jeollabuk-do, South Korea, Lee studied piano for much of her youth, without giving much thought to becoming an actress. She moved to Seoul after graduating high school and was first noticed in the mid-1990s as a model for school uniforms. After finding work as a model, she began to be offered roles in various TV dramas, including Start and KAIST. Her film debut came in 1999, when she played the younger sister in Park Chong-wan's award-winning feature Rainbow Trout. 

Her first lead role came as the title character in Hong Sang-soo's Virgin Stripped Bare by Her Bachelors (2000).

Following this, she teamed with actor Lee Byung-hun in the 2001 hit film Bungee Jumping of Their Own, and also scored a hit opposite Cha Tae-hyun in the melodrama Lovers' Concerto.

Lee's later career was marked by several turns in films that failed at the box-office, plus a key role in the record-breaking Korean War film Taegukgi. In 2004 she appeared in the very popular Korean drama, Phoenix, and later that year she starred in her last feature, Daniel H. Byun's The Scarlet Letter which screened as the Closing Film at the 2004 Pusan International Film Festival.

"I'm called a new generation star, but I don't want to be the kind of person who achieves instant fame and then is quickly forgotten. I want to learn step-by-step how to become a good actress, and gradually work my way up. A star achieves brilliance, but is soon forgotten; to become an actress takes more time." [Interview Excerpt: Kino, #60, February 2000]

Death and subsequent tributes
On the night of February 22, 2005, only a few days after her graduation from Dankook University, Lee died by suicide at her apartment in Bundang, Seongnam, after slitting her wrists and hanging herself. She was 24 years old. The family blamed the suicide on severe bouts of depression and mental illness and said she had been suffering from insomnia due to the nude scenes she had done in The Scarlet Letter, but it could also be traced from Bungee Jumping of Their Own, where all her characters since then have died, so she was too invested in her characters.

She left a suicide note scrawled in blood, in which she wrote, "Mom, I am sorry and I love you." A separate note said, "I wanted to do too much. Even though I live, I'm not really alive. I don't want anyone to be disappointed. It's nice having money... I wanted to make money."

The news of her death prompted a massive outpouring of grief from fellow actors and filmmakers and fans. Lee Eun-ju was cremated and enshrined in a crypt at Goyang. Hundreds of her fellow actors and entertainers attended her funeral. Vocalist Bada sang "You Were Born to be Loved", and friends spoke in her memory.

Her friends and colleagues have held memorials for Lee every year since her death. The 2007 event was marked by a music CD released in her name, featuring remastered versions of her cover performance of The Corrs''' "Only When I Sleep" from The Scarlet Letter'', as well as tribute performances by her friends in the entertainment industry.

Filmography

Film

Television series

Music video

Discography

Awards and nominations

See also
 Suicide in South Korea

References

External links
 
 
 

1980 births
People from Gunsan
Dankook University alumni
Suicides by hanging in South Korea
South Korean film actresses
South Korean television actresses
2005 suicides
Female suicides
2005 deaths